The 2011 Slovenian Supercup was the seventh edition of the Slovenian Supercup, an annual football match contested by the winners of the previous season's Slovenian PrvaLiga and Slovenian Cup competitions. The match was played on 8 July 2011, in Ljudski vrt stadium between 2010–11 Slovenian PrvaLiga winners Maribor and 2010–11 Slovenian Football Cup winners Domžale. Both teams contested for their second Supercup title.

Background 
The match was played by the best two teams of the 2010–11 season. During the course of that season Maribor was a league champion with Domžale being the only serious contender through most of the season, eventually finishing as runners up. The two teams were the only ones in the league that earned 20 or more victories, with Maribor achieving 21 and Domžale 20. In addition, both teams were part of the Slovenian cup final, held at Stožice stadium in Ljubljana and won by Domžale with the score 4–3 after regulation. The match is arguably one of the best Slovenian cup final ever held, since the competition was first introduced during the 1991–92 season.

Match details

See also
2010–11 Slovenian PrvaLiga
2010–11 Slovenian Football Cup
2011–12 NK Maribor season

References 

Slovenian Supercup
Supercup
Slovenian Supercup 2011
Slovenian Supercup 2011